A list of films produced by the Israeli film industry in 1995.

1995 releases

Unknown premiere date

Awards

See also
1995 in Israel

References

External links
 Israeli films of 1995 at the Internet Movie Database

Israeli
Film
1995